The 1978 Pot Black was a professional invitational snooker tournament, which was held in the Pebble Mill Studios in Birmingham, and this year, the tournament returned to 8 players competing in 2 four player groups. All matches were one-frame shoot-outs but the final this year was played in the best of 3 frames on a one-hour programme.

Broadcasts were on BBC2 and started at 21:00 on Friday 6 January 1978  Alan Weeks presented the programme with Ted Lowe as commentator and Sydney Lee as referee.

The previous year's finalist Doug Mountjoy beat twice Pot Black Champion Graham Miles in the first final to have a best of 3 frames format 2–1.

Main draw

The draw for the group stages was made by comedian Eric Morecambe and shown before the first match.

Group 1

Group 2

Knockout stage

References

Pot Black
1978 in snooker
1978 in English sport